Patric Cabral Lalau (born 25 March 1989), simply known as Patric, is a Brazilian footballer who plays as a right-back for América Mineiro.

As an international for the Brazil under-20 team, he was often compared to fellow countryman Maicon.

Career
Patric started his career with local club Criciúma, where he played from 2007 to 2008.

In 2009, he was signed by Brasa, a proxy club for Energy Sports, both football agent and agent for investors. He was immediately loaned to São Caetano, in which he became an youth international player for the Brazilian under-20 team, where  In 2009, he played for Brazil at the 2009 South American Youth Championship, a tournament which Brazil won. After such fantastic displays for club and country, he received interest from Portuguese club Benfica.

On 18 April 2009, it was reported that Patric would join Benfica at the end of the season for a reported €2 million fee for 70% economic rights. It also revealed that Benfica paid €3 million immediately to Patric's former clubs when he was signed and Brasa paid back Benfica to buy 30% economic rights for €900,000 in 3 annual installments from 2009–10 season to 2011–12 season, despite Benfica signed Patric directly from Brasa.

On 29 Jun 2009, Patric was officially presented at Benfica's Estádio da Luz in Lisbon. In August 2009 Patric returned to Brazil for top division club Cruzeiro.

In January 2010, he left for Avaí on a season's long loan. In 2011 Benfica sold Patric's 100% registration rights   and 50% economic rights to Atlético Mineiro for a reported €1 million, Benfica remained eligible to 20% transfer fee that Mineiro received.

On 17 August 2011, in a match against Corinthians had an altercation with his coach, Cuca. He was subsequently told to practise away from the team. A series of loan deals followed. A month later, he signs his first loan deal, with Ponte Preta. There, he won promotion to the 2012 Série A.

In February 2012, Patric moves to Avaí on a second loan. He played his first match at 22 February against Joinville. In July 2012, he moved, this time to Náutico. In January 2013, he moved on loan for fourth time. In June 2013, Patric moved on loan for a fifth time, now to Sport Recife, where he would stay a further year, after a renewal of the loan deal was agreed. On 10 September 2014, he scored a hat-trick against Santos.

On 27 July 2021, Patric returned to Belo Horizonte and was presented as a new player of América Mineiro, after rescinding his contract with Sport Recife. He signed a contract until the end of the 2021 season.

Honours
Coritiba
Campeonato Paranaense: 2013

Sport Recife
Copa do Nordeste: 2014

Atlético Mineiro
Campeonato Mineiro: 2015

Brazil
2009 South American Youth Championship: 2009

Footnotes

References

External links
 
 

1989 births
Living people
People from Criciúma
Brazilian footballers
Association football defenders
Campeonato Brasileiro Série A players
Campeonato Brasileiro Série B players
Criciúma Esporte Clube players
Associação Desportiva São Caetano players
Cruzeiro Esporte Clube players
Associação Atlética Ponte Preta players
Clube Atlético Mineiro players
Avaí FC players
Clube Náutico Capibaribe players
Coritiba Foot Ball Club players
Sport Club do Recife players
Esporte Clube Vitória players
América Futebol Clube (MG) players
S.L. Benfica footballers
Brazil youth international footballers
Brazilian expatriate footballers
Brazilian expatriate sportspeople in Portugal
Expatriate footballers in Portugal
Sportspeople from Santa Catarina (state)